Mount Dama Ali is a  wide shield volcano in Ethiopia, on the shore of Lake Abbe.

References

Dama Ali
Dama Ali
Polygenetic shield volcanoes